Pedro Cubero Sebastián (El Frasno, Spain, 1645 – 1700) was a Spanish priest, best known for his eastwards travel around the world from 1670 to 1679. Taking in account his world circumnavigation and his journeys across Europe he was undoubtedly one of the most widely traveled men in his time.

Pedro Cubero was born in the village of  El Frasno, near to Calatayud, in the Spanish region of Aragón. He studied in Zaragoza and Salamanca, up to his ordination as a priest in Zaragoza, and soon afterwards went to Rome, where he joined the Propaganda Fide congregation.

Around the world

In accordance with his missionary work, he undertook in 1670 a journey to East Asia, that eventually led him to complete an eastwards around the world trip. The journey is specially memorable as for the first time in History a considerable part of the way was done overland, through Western and Eastern Europe, Western and Central Asia and North America. So, he preceded Gemelli Careri who undertook a similar voyage twenty years later.

Actually, he visited Paris, Venice, Istanbul, Warsaw (he attended there the enthronement of John III Sobieski), Vilna, Moscow (where he met Nicolae Milescu, who acted as Cubero's interpreter in the presence of tzar Alexis of Russia), Astrakhan, Isfahan, Qazvin (where he was received by Shah Suleiman of Persia), Bandar Abbass, Surat, Goa, Colombo, Mylapore, Malacca, Philippines, Moluccas, Acapulco, Veracruz, Havana and eventually Cádiz, among many other places.

Vicissitudes in Far East
While sailing from Colombo to Mylapore Cubero was captured by Malabar pirates and enslaved in the Maldive Islands for a few months. In Malacca, he was put in jail by the Dutch Governor, accused of publicly preaching Catholicism.

Once in the Philippines, a Spanish colony, he realized that he was not very welcomed, as he did not belong to any of the Religious Orders that monopolized the missionary work. While in Manila he suffered the big earthquake of November 29, 1677. He went for a while to Tidore, despite the recent withdrawal of the Spanish forces there, and it is not clear if he actually entered China although anyway he dedicated three very detailed chapters of his Peregrinación del Mundo to China, Tartary and the Chinese-Tartarian wars.

Aboard the Manila galleon
As he felt somehow passed over in the Philippines, he eventually decided to proceed to New Spain. He crossed the Pacific Ocean in the 1678 sailing of the Manila galleon, that time a carrack named San Antonio de Padua commanded by Don Felipe Montemayor y Prado. The navigation started in Cavite on 24 June, they caught sight of the American land on 5 December in latitude North of 29 degrees and docked in Acapulco on 8 January 1679. Only 192 people were alive, several of them dying, out of more than 400 that had begun the voyage.

Back in the Spanish court
In New Spain he again did not feel himself useful, and decided to return to Spain, this time crossing the Atlantic Ocean.
He finally reached Madrid in  January 1680, just in time to attend the celebrations of the arrival of Maria Luisa of Orléans, recently married to King Charles II of Spain.

He wrote the account of his adventures around the world in a very objective, detailed and interesting book, Peregrinación del mundo (World's peregrination), first published in Madrid in 1680. An extended second edition was brought out in 1682 in Naples, by then a Spanish possession.

Across Europe again
Later on Cubero went again to Rome, and was appointed by the Holy See Apostolic confessor of the Army of Leopold I, Holy Roman Emperor and King of Hungary, in the Great Turkish War. There he witnessed the 1686 siege of Buda. He then traveled to other European countries, including England where he met King James II, and in 1697 published a second book, Segunda Peregrinación ..., that gathered together his European experiences.

References

  Pedro Cubero Sebastián, Peregrinación del mundo, Madrid, 1993. 
  "Peregrinación del mundo" de Pedro Cubero Sebastián, Colección Cisneros, dirigida por Don Ciriaco Pérez Bustamante, Catedrático de la Universidad Central. Madrid, (1943). Ediciones Atlas, 174 pages.
  "Segunda peregrinacion del dotor D. Pedro Cubero Sebastian ... donde refiere los sucessos mas memorables, assi en las guerras de Vngria ... como en los ultimos tumultos de Ingalaterra, deposicion del rey Iacobo, y introducion del principe Guillermo de Nassao, ...", Valencia, (1697).

External links
 entros/asiriologiayegipto/asiriologia/asirio_art01.html University web about Spanish travellers in the East   (Web page Universidad Autónoma de Madrid, Spain)

See also
Martín Ignacio de Loyola
Pedro Ordóñez de Ceballos

1645 births
Spanish Roman Catholic missionaries
17th-century Spanish Roman Catholic priests
17th-century travel writers
Spanish travel writers
17th-century Spanish writers
Circumnavigators of the globe
1700 deaths